Ferdows District is a district (bakhsh) in Rafsanjan County, Kerman Province, Iran. At the 2006 census, its population was 14,959, in 3,829 families.  The district has one city: Safayyeh. The district has two rural districts (dehestan): Ferdows Rural District and Rezvan Rural District.

References 

Rafsanjan County
Districts of Kerman Province